Hypericum × inodorum is a nothospecies of flowering plant in the family Hypericaceae which is native to France, Italy, and Spain, and has been introduced to the United Kingdom, Ireland, Portugal, Switzerland, Chile, Mexico, New Zealand, and Indonesia. The nothospecies is a fertile hybrid of Hypericum androsaemum and Hypericum hircinum, and its hybrid name inodorum derives from the Latin for "odorless". Its cultivar 'Wilhyp' has gained the Royal Horticultural Society's Award of Garden Merit.

References 

inodorum
Flora of Europe